Love, Peace & Poetry - Vol.4 Japan is the fourth volume in the Love, Peace & Poetry series released by QDK Media and Normal Records in 2001. This volume explores obscuro garage rock and psychedelic rock bands from Japan.

Track listing
 "Happenings Theme" (The Happenings Four) – 1:01
 "Liver Juice Vending Machine" (Foodbrain) – 2:39
 "Tomorrow's Child" (Apryl Fool) – 4:19
 "Run and Hide" (Speed, Glue & Shinki) – 4:50
 "Hidariashi no Otoko" (Yuya Uchida & The Flowers) – 4:39
 "Brane Baster" (Blues Creation) – 2:02
 "Freedom of a Mad Paper Lantern" (Shinki Chen) – 3:08
 "Gloomy Flower" (Jacks) – 3:17
 "Kimi Ha Darenanda" (Tokedashita Garasubako) – 3:00
 "You All Should Think More" (Justin Heathcliff) – 2:23
 "Keep It Cool" (Speed, Glue & Shinki) – 4:19
 "The Lost Mother Land, Pt. 1" (Apryl Fool) – 5:41
 "A White Dove in Disguise" (Masahiko Sato) – 2:03
 "Kirikyogen" (Kawachi, Kuni & Friends) – 5:06
 "Asamade Matenai" (The Mops) – 3:08
 "Koishite Aishite" (The Beavers) – 3:15
 "I Want You" (The Happenings) – 3:02

Love, Peace & Poetry albums
2001 compilation albums
Garage rock albums by Japanese artists
Psychedelic rock albums by Japanese artists
Compilation albums by Japanese artists